Howard "Buzz" Feiten (born November 4, 1948) is an American singer-songwriter, guitarist, session musician, and luthier. He is best known as a lead and rhythm guitarist and for having patented a tuning system for guitars and similar instruments. Feiten also manufactures and markets solid-body electric guitars.

Early years
Feiten grew up in Huntington Station and Centerport, New York, where he was known by schoolmates and friends as "Buzzy". The son of a musical mother, Pauline (a classical pianist), and an airline pilot, Howard Sr., Feiten received training in classical music as a child. His older sister Paula was a flautist and fashion model in the mid-1960s. A younger brother, Jon, was also involved in music and the arts. In youth, he studied several musical instruments, settling on the French horn. As a teenager, he played in all-county (Suffolk) and all-state (New York) youth orchestras on the instrument.

Feiten first played Carnegie Hall in 1966 on French horn in American Youth Performs. In 1966, he auditioned at the Juilliard School on French horn but was rejected. In high school he belonged to a band called The Reasons Why with Steve Beckmeier (rhythm guitar), Al Stegmeyer (drums), Danny Horton (lead guitar), and Daniel Kretzer (keyboards). The band was successful on Long Island, and two songs, "Tell Her One More Time" and "Same Old Worries", were mentioned in a Billboard 'new singles' article in the summer of 1966.

Career
Still known as "Buzzy", in late 1968 or early 1969 Feiten was a student at the Mannes College of Music in New York City.

Feiten replaced Elvin Bishop in the Paul Butterfield Blues Band, and recorded on the group's fifth album, Keep on Moving. With Butterfield, Feiten toured internationally and played at the Atlantic City Pop Festival and the Woodstock Festival.

In 1970-71, Feiten was lead guitarist for The Rascals on their albums Peaceful World and Island of Real.

Feiten's debut album Full Moon was released by Warner Bros. in 1972 and was recorded with Ray Barretto, Randy Brecker, Robin Clark, Gene Dinwiddie, Dave Holland, Neil Larsen, Airto Moreira, Tasha Thomas, and Phillip Wilson. A sequel, Buzz Feiten & The New Full Moon, was released in 2002 and recorded with Freddie Beckmeier on bass (brother of Steve from The Reasons Why), Jai Winding, Brandon Fields, and Gary Mallaber. In 1998–99 he was a member of the Dave Weckl Band. In 2008, Feiten recorded with Steve Postell of Pure Prairie League on the album Time Still Knocking (Immergent).

Feiten has worked with Gregg Allman, The Brecker Brothers, Bob Dylan, Aretha Franklin, Michael Franks, Al Jarreau, Rickie Lee Jones, Chaka Khan, Dave Koz, Kenny Loggins, Bette Midler, Olivia Newton-John, Wilson Pickett, David Sanborn, James Taylor, Stevie Wonder, Etta James, Dave Weckl and Don McLean.

Tuning system
Feiten patented a tuning system for guitars, marketed as the Buzz Feiten Tuning System, which is intended to correct problems of the standard equal temperament. The system can be retrofitted by a repair shop or luthier that has paid a licensing fee and received specific training. The system consists of a compensated string nut (or "shelf nut") and a method for intonating the bridge. The system was licensed to Washburn Guitars (1995–2010) and Suhr Guitars.

The tuning system is intended to create more accurate tonality of notes played on the lowest three or four frets. Some guitarists claimed to hear no difference, perhaps attributed to their particular playing style or primary musical genre. A few stated the opinion that, while a BFTS-enhanced guitar was clearly superior when recording alongside electronic keyboards, it generally rendered their tone "sterile" or "thin." Others believe that despite the company's "three or four" frets claim, the system provided marked improvement in accuracy virtually everywhere on the fretboard.

Guitars
In 2012, Feiten announced the founding of Buzz Feiten Guitars to manufacture and market solid-body electric guitars. The firm initially offered five models, the Blues Pro, T Pro, Signature Elite, Classic Pro, and Elite Pro.

In 2018, the company was renamed Buzz Feiten Guitar Research, offering three models of SuperNova guitar: Classic (two humbucker pickups), Futura (bridge humbucker and neck single-coil pickup), and Futura Super-Trem (three single-coil pickups with synchronized vibrato). The "Buzz Feiten Tuning System" is mentioned only in regards to the Classic.

Discography

As leader
 Larsen-Feiten Band (Warner Bros., 1980)
 Full Moon with Full Moon (Warner Bros., 1982)
 Whirlies (Ulftone Music, 2000)
 Buzz Feiten & the New Full Moon (Dreamsville, 2002)

As sideman
With Aretha Franklin
 Spirit in the Dark (Atlantic, 1970)
 Sweet Passion (Atlantic, 1977)
 Love All the Hurt Away (Arista, 1981)

With Rickie Lee Jones
 Rickie Lee Jones (Warner Bros., 1979)
 Pirates (Warner Bros., 1981)
 The Magazine (Warner Bros., 1984)
 Flying Cowboys (Geffen, 1989)

With Neil Larsen
 Jungle Fever (Horizon, 1978)
 High Gear (Horizon, 1979)
 Through Any Window (MCA, 1987)
 Smooth Talk (MCA, 1989)

With Jeff Lorber
 Private Passion (Warner Bros., 1986)
 Worth Waiting for (Verve Forecast, 1993)
 Midnight (Zebra, 1998)

With Adam Mitchell
 Redhead In Trouble (Warner Bros. Records, 1979)

With Bill Quateman
 Just Like You (RCA Victor, 1979)
 The Almost Eve of Everything (Next of Skin 2001)
 Trust (Dreamsville, 2002)

With David Sanborn
 Taking Off (Warner Bros., 1975)
 Voyeur (Warner Bros., 1981)
 As We Speak (Warner Bros., 1982)
 Backstreet (Warner Bros., 1983)

With Tom Scott
 Street Beat (Columbia, 1979)
 Desire (Elektra Musician 1982)
 Smokin' Section (Windham Hill, 1999)

With Dave Weckl
 Rhythm of the Soul (Stretch, 1998)
 Synergy (Stretch, 1999)
 The Zone (Stretch, 2001)

With others
 Deborah Allen, Cheat the Night (RCA, 1983)
 Gregg Allman, Laid Back (Capricorn, 1973)
 Anri, Boogie Woogie (Mainland for Life, 1988)
 Jeff Baxter, Guitar Workshop in L.A. (Invitation, 1988)
 Stephen Bishop, Red Cab to Manhattan (Warner Bros., 1980)
 Butterfield Blues Band, Keep On Moving (ATCO, 1969)
 Paul Butterfield, Live at Rockpalast 1978 (MIG, 2019)
 Doug Cameron, Journey to You (Narada, 1991)
 Luis Cardenas, Animal Instinct (Allied Artists 2012)
 Felix Cavaliere, Destiny (Bearsville, 1975)
 Felix Cavaliere, Castles in the Air (Epic, 1979)
 Chicago, Chicago 18 (Warner Bros., 1986)
 Christophe, Pas Vu Pas Pris (Motors 1980)
 Don Ciccone, Forever Begins Today (Polydor, 1991)
 Gene Clark, No Other (Asylum, 1974)
 Tyler Collins, Girls Nite Out (RCA/BMG 1989)
 Commander Cody, Flying Dreams (Arista, 1978)
 Paul Cotton, Changing Horses (Sisapa, 1990)
 Randy Crawford, Windsong (Warner Bros., 1982)
 Phil Cristian, No Prisoner (Empire, 1988)
 Dino, 24/7 (4th & Broadway 1989)
 Dr. John, City Lights (Horizon, 1978)
 Bob Dylan, New Morning (Columbia, 1970)
 Michael Franks, Blue Pacific (Reprise, 1990)
 Rosie Gaines, Closer Than Close (Motown, 1995)
 Steve Grossman, Perspective (Atlantic, 1979)
 Hall & Oates, Change of Season (Arista, 1990)
 Lani Hall, Double or Nothing (A&M, 1979)
 Stuart Hamm, Kings of Sleep (Food for Thought 1989)
 Stuart Hamm, The Urge (Relativity, 1991)
 Jimi Hendrix, Blues at Midnight (Rock of Ages 2000)
 Stix Hooper, Touch the Feeling (MCA, 1982)
 Janis Ian, Restless Eyes (Columbia, 1981)
 Toshiki Kadomatsu, Reasons for Thousand Lovers (Om, 1989)
 Thomas Jefferson Kaye, Not Alone (Hudson Canyon, 1992)
 Bobby King & Terry Evans, Rhythm, Blues, Soul & Grooves (Special Delivery, 1990)
 Al Kooper, Black Coffee (Sony, 2005)
 Dave Koz, Dave Koz (Capitol, 1990)
 Dave Koz, Lucky Man (Capitol, 1993)
 Labelle, Pressure Cookin' (RCA, 1973)
 Kenny Loggins, Vox Humana (Columbia, 1985)
 Melissa Manchester, Emergency (Arista, 1983)
 Bobby Martin, Bobby Martin (Sunset Dreams 2016)
 Murray McLauchlan, Murray McLauchlan (True North, 1972)
 Don McLean, Don McLean (United Artists, 1972)
 Don McLean, Playin' Favorites (United Artists, 1973)
 Gary Meek, Gary Meek (Lipstick, 1991)
 Bette Midler, No Frills (Atlantic, 1983)
 Bette Midler, Bette of Roses (Atlantic, 1995)
 Luis Miguel, Busca Una Mujer (WEA 1988)
 Jason Miles, Mr. X (Lightyear, 1996)
 Stephanie Mills, Merciless (Casablanca, 1983)
 Mr. Mister, Pull (Little Dume, 2010)
 Alannah Myles, Rockinghorse (Atlantic, 1992)
 Randy Newman, Born Again (Warner Bros., 1979)
 Randy Newman, Land of Dreams (Reprise, 1988)
 Claus Ogerman & Michael Brecker, Cityscape (Mosaic 1982)
 Amii Ozaki, Arrows in My Eyes (TM Factory, 1998)
 Dolly Parton, Dolly, Dolly, Dolly (RCA Victor, 1980)
 Wilson Pickett, American Soul Man (Motown, 1987)
 Aileen Quinn, Bobby's Girl (Columbia, 1982)
 The Rascals, Peaceful World (Columbia, 1971)
 Brenda Russell, Love Life (A&M, 1981)
 Evie Sands, Suspended Animation (RCA Victor, 1979)
 Boz Scaggs, Other Roads (Columbia, 1988)
 Ben Sidran, The Cat and the Hat (Horizon, 1979)
 Edwin Starr, Stronger Than You Think I Am (20th Century Fox, 1980)
 Curtis Stigers, Curtis Stigers (Arista, 1991)
 Livingston Taylor, Over the Rainbow (Capricorn, 1973)
 Tanya Tucker, Should I Do It (MCA, 1981)
 Dwight Twilley, Jungle (EMI, 1984)
 Jennifer Warnes, Shot Through the Heart (Arista, 1979)
 Tim Weisberg, Party of One (MCA, 1980)
 Bruce Willis, The Return of Bruno (Motown, 1987)
 Bruce Willis, If It Don't Kill You, It Just Makes You Stronger (Motown, 1989)
 Stevie Wonder, Music of My Mind (Tamla, 1972)
 Betty Wright, Betty Wright (Epic, 1981)
 Gary Wright, Headin' Home (Warner Bros., 1979)
 Syreeta Wright, Syreeta (MoWest, 1972)
 Jesse Colin Young, The Perfect Stranger (Elektra, 1982)

References

External links
 Buzz Feiten Guitar Research

Living people
People from Centerport, New York
American blues guitarists
American male guitarists
American session musicians
American luthiers
The Rascals members
1948 births
20th-century American guitarists
20th-century American male musicians